Donald Pruen Cordner (21 January 1922 – 13 May 2009), M.B.B.S. was an Australian rules footballer who played with Melbourne in the Victorian Football League (VFL) during the 1940s. His brothers Denis, John and Ted also played for the club.

Playing career
Cordner played for Melbourne University prior to joining the VFL, studying medicine when not on the football field.

A ruckman who was also used in defence, Cordner made his debut for Melbourne in the 1941 finals series, playing in their winning grand final in just his second appearance for the club. Rarely injured, he played 144 consecutive games between 1942 and 1950.

In 1943, Cordner was named the inaugural winner of the Keith 'Bluey' Truscott Medal. Although Melbourne had been awarding the club Best & Fairest since 1935, it had remained unnamed until coach "Checker" Hughes dedicated the award to Truscott's memory after the Melbourne star and Air Force pilot perished in a training exercise earlier that year. Cordner also created history when he became the first Melbourne Cricket Club member to win the Brownlow Medal in 1946 and also the only amateur player to win the Medal. He also finished equal sixth in the 1947 Brownlow Medal count. He was club captain in 1948 and 1949, the former in a premiership season. He also captained Victoria in interstate football in the same year. Cordner was also the first Melbourne Cricket Club member to receive the Brownlow Medal.

He retired from football after the 1950 season.

Life after Football
Cordner continued to be heavily involved with football while running his medical practice at Diamond Creek. He was a member of the VFL Tribunal in 1962 and 1963 and sat on the board of the Melbourne Football Club for two stints - from 1957-58 and 1964-71. He also served on the Melbourne Cricket Club committee and was MCC President between 1985 and 1992.

In 2000 he was named in the back pocket in Melbourne's official Team of the Century.

Don Cordner died on 13 May 2009 at age 87.

When the AFLW competition was formed in 2017, his granddaughter Harriet was able to continue the Cordner link to Melbourne when she was picked in Melbourne's inaugural team.

See also
List of Australian rules football families

References

Bibliography

External links

DemonWiki profile

1922 births
2009 deaths
People educated at Melbourne Grammar School
Australian rules footballers from Melbourne
Melbourne Football Club players
Brownlow Medal winners
Keith 'Bluey' Truscott Trophy winners
Melbourne Football Club captains
Melbourne Football Club Premiership players
Two-time VFL/AFL Premiership players
People from Diamond Creek, Victoria
Medical doctors from Melbourne